Sawyerville can refer to:

 Sawyerville, Alabama
 Sawyerville, Illinois
 Sawyerville, Quebec, a village in Cookshire-Eaton, Quebec, Canada